Nová Říše is a market town in Jihlava District in the Vysočina Region of the Czech Republic. It has about 800 inhabitants.

Geography
It lies in the Křižanov Highlands. The Vápovka stream flows through the municipality. The eponymous Nová Říše Reservoir is located just outside the municipal territory.

History

According to a legend, the Premonstrate monastery in Nová Říše was founded in 1211. It is first documented in 1248. In 1354, Nová Říše was first mentioned as a market town.

During the World War II, the monastery was ambushed by Nazis. Five members of the community were murdered in Auschwitz concentration camp. Surviving monks were sentenced to prison and labour camps by the Communists in 1950. The buildings were given back to the Order after the fall of Communism in 1991.

Sights
The Monastery of the Virgin Mary is the main sight. It was last rebuilt in 1821. The monastery is connected with the neighbouring Church of Saints Peter and Paul.

Notable people
Paul Wranitzky (1756–1808), composer
Antonín Vranický (1761–1820), violinist and composer
Charles Bacik (1910–1991), glass manufacturer
Jan Novák (1921–1984), composer

References

External links

Populated places in Jihlava District
Market towns in the Czech Republic